José Isidro Gutiérrez Vásquez (born 21 October 1989), is a Salvadoran professional footballer who plays as a midfielder who last played for Municipal Limeño.

Club career
Isidro Gutiérrez started off his professional career in Municipal Limeño. He had previously been a part of their youth academy. He later moved on to one of the top teams in the country, Águila.

On May 15, 2013, Gutiérrez signed with Motagua of the Liga Nacional de Fútbol Profesional de Honduras, coming off two months as a free agent.

On December 10, 2013 Gutiérrez returned home joining Alianza from Motagua of the Liga Nacional de Fútbol Profesional de Honduras.

International career
Gutiérrez made his national team debut with  El Salvador team under coach Mauricio Alfaro. He made his under-21 debut on March 10, 2010 in a friendly match against Guatemala.

On that same game, Gutiérrez scored both of the goals for El Salvador to tie the game and end the game 2–2. Alfaro was so impressed with Gutiérrez 's performance, that he automatically selected the midfielder for the next game against the Honduran U-21 side in the 2010 CAC qualification 1st leg match. He was once again the key player in that match, scoring the only goal of the game to give El Salvador U-21 the victory on Honduran soil.

Gutiérrez also scored a goal in an exhibition game in a 2–1 loss to Serie A club Roma on July 27, 2012.

International goals

References

1989 births
Living people
People from San Miguel Department (El Salvador)
Association football midfielders
Salvadoran footballers
C.D. Águila footballers
F.C. Motagua players
El Salvador international footballers
2013 Copa Centroamericana players